George McWillie Williamson (1829–1882) was an American diplomat who served as US ambassador to Nicaragua, Costa Rica, El Salvador and Guatemala, under the administration of Ulysses S. Grant.

References

1829 births
1882 deaths
Ambassadors of the United States to Costa Rica
Ambassadors of the United States to Nicaragua
Ambassadors of the United States to El Salvador
Ambassadors of the United States to Guatemala